Rokytnice nad Jizerou is a town in Semily District in the Liberec Region of the Czech Republic. It has about 2,500 inhabitants.

Administrative parts
Rokytnice nad Jizerou is made up of town parts of Dolní Rokytnice and Horní Rokytnice, and villages of Františkov, Hleďsebe, Hranice, Rokytno and Studenov.

Etymology
Rokytnice nad Jizerou was named after the Huťský stream, formerly called Rokytnice. The name Rokytnice refers to the old Czech word rokyta (meaning "willow") a common tree in the area.

Geography

It is a mountain resort town in the western part of the Giant Mountains. The municipal territory borders Poland. The highest peak in the municipal territory is Sokolník , which is located on the border with Poland.

History
Rokytnice nad Jizerou was founded in 1574. The first inhabitants engaged in logging and metal mining (copper, lead and silver). The mining stopped paying off at the beginning of the 20th century and ceased. Other important economic activity was glassmaking.

Demographics

Sport
In winter, Rokytnice's two ski resorts in Studenov and at Mt. Lysá hora are among the most famous ski resorts in the Czech Republic.

Notable people
Karel Maydl (1853–1903), Austrian surgeon
Franz Fühmann (1922–1984), German writer
Milan Jarý (born 1952), cross-country skier
Leona Neumannová (born 1987), volleyball player

References

External links

Cities and towns in the Czech Republic
Populated places in Semily District
Ski areas and resorts in the Czech Republic